Arantxa Sánchez Vicario and Irina Spîrlea were the defending champions but only Spîrlea competed that year with Gigi Fernández.

Fernández and Spîrlea lost in the quarterfinals to Nicole Arendt and Manon Bollegraf.

Arendt and Bollegraf won in the final 6–2, 6–4 against Conchita Martínez and Patricia Tarabini.

Seeds
Champion seeds are indicated in bold text while text in italics indicates the round in which those seeds were eliminated. The top four seeded teams received byes into the second round.

Draw

Finals

Top half

Bottom half

External links
 1997 Italian Open Women's Doubles Draw

Women's Doubles
Doubles